Mah Farrokhan (also Romanized as Māh Farrokhān; also known as Māhfar Khān and Mofanghān) is a village in Khir Rural District, Runiz District, Estahban County, Fars Province, Iran. At the 2006 census, its population was 1,718, in 400 families.

References 

Populated places in Estahban County